Rocks Cluster Distribution (originally NPACI Rocks) is a Linux distribution intended for high-performance computing (HPC) clusters.  It was started by National Partnership for Advanced Computational Infrastructure and the San Diego Supercomputer Center (SDSC) in 2000. It was initially funded in part by an NSF grant (2000–07), but was funded by the follow-up NSF grant through 2011.

Distribution 
Rocks was initially based on the Red Hat Linux (RHL) distribution, however modern versions of Rocks were based on CentOS, with a modified Anaconda installer that simplifies mass installation onto many computers. Rocks includes many tools (such as Message Passing Interface (MPI)) which are not part of CentOS but are integral components that make a group of computers into a cluster.

Installations can be customized with additional software packages at install-time by using special user-supplied CDs (called "Roll CDs").  The "Rolls" extend the system by integrating seamlessly and automatically into the management and packaging mechanisms used by base software, greatly simplifying installation and configuration of large numbers of computers.  Over a dozen Rolls have been created, including the Sun Grid Engine (SGE) roll, the Condor roll, the Lustre roll, the Java roll, and the Ganglia roll.

By October 2010, Rocks was used for academic, government, and commercial organizations, employed in 1,376 clusters, on every continent except Antarctica. The largest registered academic cluster, having 8632 CPUs, is GridKa, operated by the Karlsruhe Institute of Technology in Karlsruhe, Germany. There are also a number of clusters ranging down to fewer than 10 CPUs, representing the early stages in the construction of larger systems, as well as being used for courses in cluster design. This easy scalability was a major goal in the development of Rocks, both for the researchers involved, and for the NSF:

Release history

See also 
 Scientific Linux – a Linux distribution by Fermilab and CERN
 Cray Linux Environment
 Compute Node Linux
 CNK operating system

References

External links 
 

Cluster computing
Computer-related introductions in 2000
Linux distributions
Parallel computing
RPM-based Linux distributions